Chap Darreh is a village in Karaftu Rural District of the Central District of Takab County, West Azerbaijan province, Iran. At the 2006 National Census, its population was 623 in 121 households. The following census in 2011 counted 601 people in 135 households. The latest census in 2016 showed a population of 623 people in 172 households; it was the largest village in its rural district.

References 

Takab County

Populated places in West Azerbaijan Province

Populated places in Takab County